The 48th Annual American Music Awards were held on November 22, 2020, at the Microsoft Theater in Los Angeles, recognizing the most popular artists and albums of 2020. Nominees were officially announced live on October 26, 2020, on Good Morning America by Dua Lipa. Taylor Swift, the Weeknd, Dan + Shay and Justin Bieber were the most awarded artists with three awards each. Roddy Ricch and the Weeknd were the most nominated artists with eight nominations each, followed by Megan Thee Stallion with five. Taraji P. Henson hosted the ceremony.

Background
On July 17, 2020, ABC and Dick Clark Productions issued a joint statement announcing the ceremony as well as the date of the ceremony, November 22 of the same year. The ceremony took place at the Microsoft Theater in Los Angeles. Taraji P. Henson was announced as the host of the ceremony on November 2, 2020.

Performances

Notes
  Live from 4th Street Bridge, in downtown Los Angeles.
  Broadcast live from the Royal Albert Hall, in London, England.
  Pre-recorded at Seoul Olympic Stadium, in Seoul, South Korea.

Presenters
Presenters were announced on November 19, 2020.

Taraji P. Henson – main show host
Ciara – presented Favorite Album – Soul/R&B
Cara Delevingne – presented Favorite Song – Pop/Rock
Derek Hough – presented Favorite Song – Country
Tayshia Adams – presented Favorite Female Artist – Soul/R&B
Bad Bunny – presented Favorite Female Artist – Latin
Laverne Cox – presented Favorite Song – Rap/Hip-Hop
Becky G – presented Favorite Song – Soul/R&B
Paris Hilton – presented New Artist of the Year
Anthony Anderson – presented Pop/Rock Duo/Group
Christian Serratos - presented Latin Album
Kristin Cavallari - presented Favorite Male Artist – Soul/R&B
Megan Fox – introduced Machine Gun Kelly and Travis Barker
G-Eazy - presented Collaboration of the Year
David Dobrik - advertised T-Mobile

Winners and nominees
Nominees were jointly announced by singer Dua Lipa and Good Morning America on October 26, 2020. Roddy Ricch and the Weeknd were the most nominated artists, with eight nominations each. Megan Thee Stallion received five nominations, while Bad Bunny, DaBaby, Doja Cat, Justin Bieber, Lady Gaga and Taylor Swift all tied with four.

Winners are listed first and highlighted in bold.

References

2020 awards in the United States
2020 in Los Angeles
2020 music awards
American Music Awards